A Mudhif  ( al-muḍīf) is a traditional reed house made by the Madan people (also known as Marsh Arabs) in the swamps of southern Iraq. In the traditional Madan way of living, houses are constructed from reeds harvested from the marshes where they live.  A mudhif is a large ceremonial house, paid for and maintained by a local sheik, for use by guests or as a gathering place for weddings, funerals, etc.

Description
Mudhif structures have been one of the traditional types of structures built by the Arabs of the marshlands in southern Iraq for at least 5,000 years. A carved elevation of a typical mudhif, dating to around 3,300 BCE was discovered at Uruk, and is now in the British Museum. 

A mudhif is a special type of sarifa; a structure made from reeds which grow naturally in the marshlands and is used by the village sheik as a guest-house. Other types of reed dwelling, such as a raba (with entrances at both ends and used as a family dwelling) or a bayt (strictly a single-room dwelling) are typically smaller than a mudhif and may be used for residential and other purposes. 

Each village sheik had a mudhif capable of accommodating at least ten persons. The number of arches used in a mudhif is dictated by the tribe and family group. Sometimes the mudhif was decorated with additional bundles of reeds, arranged in decorative patterns, placed on the  façade, to serve as a tribal identifier.  The entrance to the mudhif always faces Mecca.

The English writer, Gertrude Bell, wrote a description of a mudhif in a letter to her father:

Construction
In the construction of a mudhif, reeds are bundled and woven into thick columns; larger and thicker reeds are bent across and tied to form parabolic arches which make up the building's spine. These arches are strengthened by the pre-stressing of the columns, as they are initially inserted into the soil at opposing angles.<ref>Mudhif," in Encyclopedia Britannica, Online: </ref> A series of arches define the building's form. Long cross beams of smaller bundled reeds are laid across the arches and tied. Woven mats of reeds form the building envelope. Some of the mats are woven with perforations like a mesh to allow light and ventilation.

The front and back walls are attached to two large vertical bundled reed columns and are also made from woven mats. Mudhif need to be rebuilt every ten years. 

Reeds as  a construction material
The most common type of reed used for the construction of marshland mudhif is ihdri.'' Reed has properties which make it an ideal building material - it has a high concentration of silica which makes it water resistant, unattractive for insects and other pests and an excellent thermal and acoustic insulating  material. It is an inexpensive material and it is both flexible and durable as a construction material, which encourages creativity.

Use	 
 

A mudhif is used as a guest house or for ceremonial occasions, and may not be used for any other purpose. When a guest enters a mudhif, he or she will be welcomed by the village sheik, escorted to their proper place and offered refreshments such as highly sweetened coffee in a ritualised ceremony.

Recent developments
In the 1980s, some half a million Arabs lived in the marshes. However, from around 1993, Saddam Hussein began to drain the marshes in an attempt to destroy the life and culture of the southern Arabs. Following Hussein's defeat in 2003, Arab communities began to dig up the dykes, re-flooding the marshes and resuming their traditional way of life.

See also
 Culture of Iraq
 Draining of the Mesopotamian Marshes
 Iraqi art
 Vernacular architecture

References

External links

Mudhif under construction and the Marsh Arabs
House types
Architecture in Iraq
Marsh Arabs
Vernacular architecture
Arab inventions